Imanabad or Eimanabad or Eymanabad may refer to:
Imanabad, Gilan (ايمن اباد - Īmanābād)
Imanabad, Lorestan (ايمان آباد - Īmānābād)
Imanabad-e Sofla, Lorestan Province
Eminabad, Punjab Province, Pakistan